Alexander Alexandrovich Kirillov Jr. is a Russian-born American mathematician, working in the area of representation theory and Lie groups. He is a son of Russian mathematician Alexandre Kirillov.

Biography
Kirillov received his master's degree from Moscow State University in 1989 and Ph.D from Yale University in 1995. He is currently a professor at State University of New York at Stony Brook.

Kirillov is a teacher of the project School Nova, trying to establish traditions of the Russian Mathematical Schools on American soil.

Publications

External links
 Kirillov's homepage
 Kirillov's page on the SchoolPlus project
 Alexander Kirillov on the Mathematical Genealogy Project
Kirillov's page on the SchoolNova project

Year of birth missing (living people)
20th-century American mathematicians
21st-century American mathematicians
Russian mathematicians
American people of Russian descent
Yale University alumni
New York University faculty
Moscow State University alumni
Living people